Goianul Nou may refer to several places in Moldova:

 Goianul Nou, a village in Stăuceni Commune, Chişinău municipality
 Goianul Nou, a village in Dubău Commune, Transnistria